The 2013 Copa Topper was a professional tennis tournament played on clay courts. It was the fourth edition of the tournament which was part of the 2013 ATP Challenger Tour. It took place in Buenos Aires, Argentina between 21 and 27 October 2013.

Singles main draw entrants

Seeds 

 1 Rankings are as of October 14, 2013.

Other entrants 
The following players received wildcards into the singles main draw:
  Pedro Cachín
  Pablo Cuevas
  Andrés Molteni
  Eduardo Schwank

The following players received entry from the qualifying draw:
  Andrea Collarini
  Federico Coria
  Gabriel Alejandro Hidalgo
  Pedro Sousa

Champions

Singles 

 Pablo Cuevas def.  Facundo Argüello 7–6(8–6), 2–6, 6–4

Doubles 

 Máximo González /  Diego Sebastián Schwartzman def.  Rogério Dutra da Silva /  André Ghem 6–3, 7–5

External links 
Official Website

Copa Topper
Challenger de Buenos Aires